Amina Shah is Director and CEO of the National Library of Scotland.

Shah is the first woman and the first person of mixed race to hold the post, which she began in October 2021. Shah was previously Assistant Director of the Library at University of St Andrews and was Director of Programme at the Scottish Book Trust. Shah was previously leader of  Scottish Library and Information Council (SLIC) and led on the development of Scotland's first National Strategy for Public Libraries. She has a degree from University of Dundee and a postgraduate library qualification from University of Strathclyde. Before gaining the role of CEO Shah was a member of the board of trustees of the National Library.

References 

Living people
Year of birth missing (living people)

Scottish librarians

Academic librarians
British women librarians
Alumni of the University of Dundee
Alumni of the University of Strathclyde
People associated with the University of St Andrews